Mr. Rossi Looks for Happiness (in Italian Il signor Rossi cerca la felicità) is a 1976 traditionally animated Italian feature film directed by Bruno Bozzetto. It is the first feature film of Mr. Rossi.

Plot
Nothing is going right for Mr Rossi! Presto! A nutty, bumbling fairy comes to his "rescue" - just blow the magic whistle and he and his dog Harold can escape, far away from troubles, to lands long ago... The whistle takes them through the ages, but each tweet only brings new troubles! They barely "squeak" by with their lives as they meet fire-brtething dragons... hungry Roman lions... scalp-happy Indians... and Robin Hood's deadly arrows... whew! Well, the whistle is magic, but where's the happiness? Wait! Maybe, just maybe, if Mr. Rossi looks hard enough, right here, in his home, in this time...

Distribution
The movie was distributed in Europe and had a great success especially in West Germany in 1976 and in Spain in 1983.

Exit date

Cast

Additional voices (English, 2nd dubbing): Kathleen Fee

The two English version
The first dubbing was realized in the 1970s, was redubbed in the 1980s.

Home Media
While the film was never released on DVD (except for an all-regions DVD released around somewhere in late 2000s to early 2010s(?), during the 1980s, it was issued on VHS in the US by Family Home Entertainment.

See also
List of animated feature-length films
Mr. Rossi

References

External links
Official website

1976 films
1976 animated films
Italian animated films
1970s Italian-language films
Films directed by Bruno Bozzetto
Films about time travel
1970s Italian films